
Świdnik County is a unit of territorial administration and local government (powiat) in Lublin Voivodeship, eastern Poland. It was established on January 1, 1999, as a result of the Polish local government reforms passed in 1998.

As of 2019, its total population is 71,897, including a population of 39,217 in Świdnik, 2,553 in Piaski, and a rural population of 30,127.

Neighbouring counties
Świdnik County is bordered by Łęczna County to the north-east, Chełm County to the east, Krasnystaw County to the south-east, and Lublin County and the city of Lublin to the west.

Administrative division
The county is subdivided into five gminas (one urban, one urban-rural and three rural). These are listed in the following table, in descending order of population.

References

External links
 Statystyczne Vademecum Samorządowca 2016

 
Land counties of Lublin Voivodeship